Clinidium iviei is a species of ground beetle in the subfamily Rhysodinae. It was described by R.T. & J.R. Bell in 1985. It is named after Michael A. Ivie, the collector of the type series. It is known from the Oaxaca state, Mexico. Specimens in the type series measure  in length.

References

Clinidium
Beetles of North America
Endemic insects of Mexico
Beetles described in 1985